Pierre Legrand (13 May 1834, Paris – 31 May 1895, Paris) was a 19th-century French politician of the French Third Republic. He served twice as minister of commerce (7 August 1882 – 20 February 1883; 6 April 1885 – 6 January 1886) in the government of Charles Duclerc, Armand Fallières and Henri Brisson and as minister of commerce and industry (3 April 1888 – 3 February 1889) in the government of Charles Floquet.

Sources 
 
 

People of the French Third Republic
French Ministers of Commerce
Politicians from Lille
1834 births
1895 deaths
Burials at Père Lachaise Cemetery